Vandana Hemant Chavan (born 6 July 1961), is an Indian politician and advocate. She is a member of the Parliament of India, representing Maharashtra in the Rajya Sabha (Upper House of the Indian Parliament). She is from the Nationalist Congress Party (NCP) and has been a member of Parliament since 2012.

Early life
Vandana Chavan was born in Pune, where she spent her early childhood. Her father, the late Vijayarao Mohite was a veteran lawyer and her mother Jayashree Mohite retired as a part-time lecturer in law. She is married to Hemant Chavan, a prominent lawyer. Her sister Vinita Kamte was married to the late Ashok Kamte, a martyr in the 26/11 Mumbai attack.

Political career
She was elected mayor of Pune for the period of March 1997 – 1998. In that period she was Vice-Chairperson of All India Council of Mayors and also she was Chairperson of Maharashtra State Mayor, President and Councillors Organisation.  As mayor, she incorporated the concept of the Bio Diversity Park (BDP) into the development plan of the fringe villages, amid resistance from within and outside her party. Suresh Kalmadi who initially mentored her and gave her a break in politics, Chavan preferred to shift to the NCP.

Books published 
 Law of Cruelty, Abetment of Suicide and Dowry Death (Co-author), 1993. 
 Green India-Clean India, Swapna Udyachi-Sundar Jagachi (a reference book in Marathi on climate change), 2011.

References

Living people
1961 births
Politicians from Pune
Members of the Maharashtra Legislative Council
Marathi politicians
Nationalist Congress Party politicians from Maharashtra
Women in Maharashtra politics
Mayors of Pune
Rajya Sabha members from Maharashtra
Indian National Congress politicians from Maharashtra
21st-century Indian women politicians
21st-century Indian politicians
Women members of the Rajya Sabha